Events from the year 1872 in art.

Events
 February 20 – The Metropolitan Museum of Art opens in New York City.
 June – American-born painter James McNeill Whistler exhibits Arrangement in Grey and Black: The Artist's Mother, painted the previous year, at the 104th Royal Academy summer exhibition in London after the curator Sir William Boxall threatens to resign from the R.A. if it is rejected.
 November 13 (07:35) (probable date) – Claude Monet begins painting Impression, Sunrise (Impression, soleil levant) as viewed from his hotel room at Le Havre.
 November – Edward Lear acquires his cat Foss.
date unknown
William De Morgan sets up an art pottery in Chelsea, London.
The first "Wallace fountains", to the design of sculptor Charles-Auguste Lebourg, are installed in Paris.
Lise Tréhot last models for Renoir.

Works

 Peter Nicolai Arbo – The Wild Hunt of Odin
 Arnold Böcklin – Self-portrait with Death playing the fiddle
 Caspar Buberl – Fulton Memorial (New York City)
 Pierre Puvis de Chavannes
 Hope
 The White Rocks
 Gustave Doré – illustrations to London: A Pilgrimage (published)
 Frank Duveneck – The Whistling Boy (Cincinnati Art Museum)
 William Powell Frith – The Fair Toxophilites
 John Gast – American Progress
 Jean-Léon Gérôme – Pollice Verso ("Thumbs Down")
 Ivan Kramskoi
 Christ in the Desert
 Old Man with a crutch
 Henri Fantin-Latour - The Corner of the Table
 Édouard Manet
 Berthe Morisot with a Bouquet of Violets (Musée d'Orsay, Paris) 
 Berthe Morisot with a Fan (Musée d'Orsay, Paris)
 Berthe Morisot (Private collection)
 Le chemin de fer ("The Railroad") (National Gallery of Art, Washington, D.C.)
 Racecourse in the Bois de Boulogne (Private collection)
 Claude Monet
 Effet de Brouillard
 Impression, Sunrise
 Springtime
 Thomas Moran – The Grand Canyon of the Yellowstone (first version)
 Berthe Morisot
 The Cradle (Musée d'Orsay, Paris)
 On the Balcony
 Vasily Perov
 Portrait of Fyodor Dostoevsky
 Portrait of Vladimir Dal
 Illarion Pryanishnikov – Empties
 Pierre-Auguste Renoir
 Claude Monet Reading
 Parisian Women in Algerian Costume (The Harem)
 Le Pont-Neuf
 Woman with Parasol Seated in the Garden
 Dante Gabriel Rossetti – Beata Beatrix (replica, commissioned by William Graham)
 Emil Jakob Schindler – The Steamer station on the Danube opposite Kaisermühlen
 Alfred Sisley
 Bridge at Villeneuve-la-Garonne
 Footbridge at Argenteuil
 James Tissot – Bad News
 Wilhelm Trübner – Auf dem Kanapee ("On the Sofa") (Nationalgalerie, Berlin)
 Frederick Walker – The Harbour of Refuge
 James McNeill Whistler – Arrangement in Gray: Portrait of the Painter
 Mårten Eskil Winge – Thor's Fight with the Giants

Births
 January 16 – Edward Gordon Craig, English theatrical designer (died 1966)
 January 25 – Eleanor Fortescue-Brickdale, English painter (died 1945)
 February 25 – Alice Bailly Swiss painter and multimedia artist (died 1938)
 March 7 – Piet Mondrian, Dutch painter (died 1944)
 April 18 – Beta Vukanović, Serbian painter and centenarian (died 1972)
 August 21 – Aubrey Beardsley, English painter and illustrator (died 1898)

Deaths
 April 2 – Samuel F. B. Morse, American inventor and painter of portraits and historic scenes (born 1791)
 April 10 – John Mix Stanley, American painter (born 1814)
 May 24 – Julius Schnorr von Carolsfeld, German painter (born 1794)
 August 8 – Eduard Magnus, German painter (born 1799)
 September 30 - Jakob Alt, German landscape painter (born 1789)
 October 29 – Thomas Combe, English printer and patron of the arts (born 1796)
 November 5 – Thomas Sully, English-born American portrait painter (born 1783)
 November 13 - Margaret Sarah Carpenter, English portrait painter (born 1793)
 November 25 - John Partridge, British artist and portrait painter (born 1789)
 December 23 – George Catlin, American painter who specialized in portraits of Native Americans in the Old West (born 1796)
probable - Severin Roesen, American painter of still lives (born 1815)

References

 
Years of the 19th century in art
1870s in art